East Sydney Australian Football Club is a NSWFL Australian Football foundation club based out of the Sydney eastern suburbs in New South Wales.

The club formed in 1880 as the first Australian Rules club in New South Wales, participating in the NSWAFA in 1881. The Sydney Morning Herald report on 12 August 1880 states, "A meeting was held on Tuesday night at the Cambridge Club hotel, Oxford street, to organise a club under the New South Wales Football Association".

This would mean that the East Sydney Australian Football club, if one puts aside the mergers and name changes that have occurred (now known as the Uni of NSW-Eastern Suburbs Bulldogs) is older than all but one other current major football club of any code in Sydney (that being Sydney University Football (rugby) Club). This club pre-dates all Australian rugby league clubs by over 25 years, the Randwick rugby union team and all known soccer clubs.

By the 1920s, East Sydney had become one of the most successful clubs in Sydney, along with Paddington Australian Football Club. In 1926, it merged with the Paddington club to become the Eastern Suburbs Australian Football Club.

The home ground for East Sydney Football Club was Trumper Park in Paddington and they played in the colours of blue with red and white hoops.

Later this club again merged with the University club to become the Uni-NSW Eastern Suburbs Bulldogs AFC.

References 

Australian rules football clubs in Sydney
1880 establishments in Australia
1926 disestablishments in Australia
Australian rules football clubs established in 1880
Australian rules football clubs disestablished in 1926